Ponikve may refer to:

Bosnia and Herzegovina
Ponikve, Čajniče, a settlement in the Municipality of Čajniče

Croatia
NK Ponikve, a Croatian soccer club based in Zagreb
Ponikve, a settlement in Ston
Ponikve, a village in Ogulin 
Ponikve, a village in Bakar

Serbia
Ponikve, Golubac
Ponikve Airport, an airport near Užice

Slovenia
Ponikve, Brežice, a settlement in the Municipality of Brežice
Ponikve, Cerknica, a settlement in the Municipality of Cerknica
Ponikve, Dobrepolje, a settlement in the Municipality of Dobrepolje
Ponikve, Sežana, a settlement in the Municipality of Sežana
Ponikve, Tolmin, a settlement in the Municipality of Tolmin
Ponikve pri Studencu, a settlement in the Municipality of Sevnica
Ponikve, Semič, a former settlement in the Municipality of Semič